Glue is any fluid adhesive.

Glue or GLUE may also refer to:

In arts and entertainment
 Glue (film), a 2006 Argentine film written and directed by Alexis Dos Santos
 Glue (novel), a novel by Scottish writer Irvine Welsh
 Glue (TV series), a 2014 British television drama written  by Jack Thorne
 "Glue" (New Girl)
 "Glue" (Weeds)

In music
 Glue (Eugene + the Lizards album), 2009
 Glue (Boston Manor album), 2020
 "Glue", a song from the 2010 Ten (Gabriella Cilmi album)
 "Glue", a song by Bicep from their 2017 Bicep (album)
 "Glue", a song by Breathe Carolina from their 2017 EP Coma
 Glue, a hip-hop trio fronted by Adeem (rapper)
 "Glue" a 2023 song by Beabadoobee

In electronics and computing
 Glue logic, circuitry to interface between off-the-shelf integrated circuits
 Glue records, records used in the Domain Name System (DNS)
 General Language Understanding Evaluation, a benchmark in Natural Language Understanding
 Grid Laboratory Uniform Environment, a technology-agnostic information model for a uniform representation of Grid resources

Software
 glue (software), a data-visualization package
 Glue code, code that serves to "glue together" otherwise incompatible code
 Glue language, a programming language used for connecting software components together
 webMethods Glue, a platform that provides web services/SOAP capabilities to existing Java and C/C++ applications

Other uses
 GLUE (uncertainty assessment), a method to quantify the uncertainty of model predictions
 Glue semantics, a syntax-semantics interface formalism based on linear logic
 Quotient space (topology), or gluing spaces, the concept of gluing points or subspaces together

See also
Glu (disambiguation)